Nerio Bernardi (23 July 1899 – 12 January 1971) was an Italian film actor. He appeared in nearly 200 films between 1918 and 1970. He was born in Bologna, Italy and died in Rome, Italy.

Selected filmography

 Nero (1922)
 The Shepherd King (1923)
 Full Speed (1934)
 Port (1934)
 Loyalty of Love (1934)
 God's Will Be Done (1936)
 King of Diamonds (1936)
 Bayonet (1936)
 The Black Corsair (1937)
 Abandonment (1940)
 Captain Fracasse (1940)
 Lucrezia Borgia (1940)
 Antonio Meucci (1940)
 The Last Dance (1941)
 The Mask of Cesare Borgia (1941)
 A che servono questi quattrini? (1942)
 The Queen of Navarre (1942)
 Fedora (1942)
 In High Places (1943)
 Special Correspondents (1943)
 The Two Orphans (1947)
 The Courier of the King (1947)
 The Lady of the Camellias (1947)
 Mare Nostrum (1948)
 Be Seeing You, Father (1948)
 The Charterhouse of Parma (1948)
 The Emperor of Capri (1949)
 Hand of Death (1949)
 Adam and Eve (1949)
 The Force of Destiny (1950)
 Toto Looks for a Wife (1950)
 Captain Demonio (1950)
 The Cadets of Gascony (1950)
 The Devil in the Convent (1950)
 Free Escape (1951)
 Beauties on Bicycles (1951)
 The Young Caruso (1951)
 The Ungrateful Heart (1951)
 Fanfan la Tulipe (1952)
 Milady and the Musketeers (1952)
 Son of the Hunchback (1952)
 Immortal Melodies (1952)
 The Mistress of Treves (1952)
 Martin Toccaferro (1953)
 The Enchanting Enemy (1953)
 If You Won a Hundred Million (1953)
 The Daughter of the Regiment (1953)
 Ivan, Son of the White Devil (1953)
 Il viale della speranza (1953)
 Theodora, Slave Empress (1954)
 The King's Prisoner (1954)
 The Beautiful Otero (1954)
 The Lovers of Manon Lescaut (1954)
 Papà Pacifico (1954)
 The Doctor of the Mad (1954)
 Mam'zelle Nitouche (1954) 
La tua donna (1954)
 Sunset in Naples (1955)
 The White Angel (1955)
 Altair (1956)
 Kean: Genius or Scoundrel (1956)
 The Knight of the Black Sword (1956)
 Wives and Obscurities (1956)
 Il Conte di Matera (1957)
 Attack of the Moors (1959)
 La Donna dei Faraoni (AKA: The Pharaoh's Woman) (1960)
 Long Night in 1943 (1960)
The Night They Killed Rasputin (1960)
 Minotaur, the Wild Beast of Crete (1960)
 Purple Noon (1960)
 Vanina Vanini (1961)
 The Corsican Brothers (1961)
 El Cid (1961)credited as Nelio Bernardi
 The Avenger (1962)
 Zorro and the Three Musketeers (1963)
 Hercules vs. Moloch (1963)
 Hercules and the Black Pirates (1964)
 Three Swords for Rome (1964)
 Revenge of The Gladiators (1964) 
 Satanik (1968)
 The Tigers of Mompracem (1970)

References

External links

1899 births
1971 deaths
20th-century Italian male actors
Italian male film actors
Italian male silent film actors
Actors from Bologna